Freilassing station is located in the Upper Bavarian district of Berchtesgaden. It is the last German station on the railway line from Munich to Salzburg, a border station to Austria and the only station in the town of Freilassing.

The station is the junction between the Rosenheim–Salzburg, Salzburg–Berchtesgaden and Salzburg–Mühldorf lines and is used daily by about 160 trains operated by Deutsche Bahn, the Austrian Federal Railways and the Berchtesgadener Land Bahn.

Location
The station is located north of the town centre. The station area is bounded to the north by Rupertusstraße and to the south by Bahnhofstrasse (station street). To the west there is a footbridge linking Bahnhofstrasse and Rupertusstraße. The station building is located south of the railway facilities and has the address of Bahnhofstrasse 4

History
Freilassing station was opened in 1860 together with the railway line from Munich to Salzburg. It then served as a border station between Austria and Bavaria. In 1866, Freilassing was connected to another line (Freilassing–Bad Reichenhall) and in 1888 it was extended to Berchtesgaden. A branch line (Lokalbahn) was opened to Laufen in 1890 and it was extended to Tittmoning in 1894. In 1916, electrification was completed on the Freilassing-Berchtesgaden line.

With the entry of Austria in the European Union in 1995, the station lost its importance as a border station.

Freilassing locomotive depot 

With the opening of lines to Tittmoning and Berchtesgaden and the general increase in traffic, a locomotive depot (Bahnbetriebswerk) was required. This was built from 1902 to 1905 in the northwest of the station area. It had twenty roads and a turntable that was enlarged in 1924 to a length of 23 metres. In 1994, the depot was closed. In 1998, the training workshop was closed. The building has been classified as a historical monument since 1998 and it now houses a railway museum.

Infrastructure

The station has seven through tracks on four platforms, with track 1 as the “home” platform (Hausbahnsteig), that is next to the station building. Each platform is covered and has digital platform displays. All platforms are connected by a pedestrian tunnel to the home platform. It has only partial step-free access to the platform. The station building has among other things a ticket office.  Park and ride parking and bike racks are available in the station area.

The station has been located in the area administered by the Salzburg Transport Association (Salzburger Verkehrsverbund) since 2006 and is served by the Salzburg S-Bahn network. The municipal bus company (Freilassinger StadtBus) operates bus routes 81 and 82 through the Freilassing urban area, connecting with the station. In addition to the local services, Freilassing station is connected by bus route 24 via the stops of Salzburger Platz and Rupertikirche/Rathaus to the public bus network of the city of Salzburg.

Platform data 
Platform lengths and heights are as follows:
Track 1: length 421 m, height 38 cm
Track 2: length 421 m, height 22 cm
Track 3: length 421 m, height 22 cm
Track 4: length 416 m, height 22 cm
Track 5: length 416 m, height 22 cm
Track 7: length 300 m, height 22 cm
Track 8: length 300 m, height 22 cm

Rail services 

Freilassing station is served by EuroCity services operated by Deutsche Bahn, in cooperation with the Austrian Federal Railways. It is also served by local trains operated by Meridian (a subsidiary of Bayerische Oberlandbahn) to Munich, Salzburg and Rosenheim and by Südostbayernbahn to Mühldorf. The local trains on the line to Berchtesgaden are operated by Berchtesgadener Land Bahn (as line S 4 of the Salzburg S-Bahn) and by the Salzburg S-Bahn (as line S 3, which also continues to Salzburg Central Station in Austria).

Gallery

References

Railway stations in Bavaria
Railway stations in Germany opened in 1860
Buildings and structures in Berchtesgadener Land